The 6th Army Corps was one of three army corps of the Ukrainian Ground Forces. The Corps was headquartered in Dnipropetrovsk, Ukraine. Its units were spread across Poltava Oblast, Sumy Oblast, Kharkiv Oblast, and Kirovohrad Oblast. The Corps was formed in 1993 after the collapse of the Soviet Union from a redesignation of the former Soviet 6th Guards Tank Army. It was disbanded in 2013 when the Ukrainian Ground Forces were reorganized, being replaced by Operational Command South.

History 

6th Guards Tank Army had incorporated three tank divisions, the 17th Guards, 42nd, and 75th Guards. However the later two were disbanded by 1991−92. In 1992 Zaloga listed the 17th Guards Tank Division and 93rd Motor Rifle Division as being part of the army. However, in 1991−1993 the 254th Motor Rifle Division, was withdrawn from the Southern Group of Forces and joined the 6th Army Corps, garrisoned at Artemivsk. It later became the 254th Mechanised Division.

In Decree of the President of Ukraine No 350/93, 21.08.1993, 'On conferring military ranks', Colonel Ivan Svidi, named as commander of the 17th Guards Tank Division of the 6th Army Corps (Odessa MD), was promoted to Major-General. Thus by August 1993 the Corps had been shifted to the Odessa Military District. On December 3, 1993 Colonel Vladimir Polivoda, Commander 254th Mechanized Division, 6th Army Corps, Odessa Military District was promoted to Major General It later became the 52nd Mechanised Brigade.

In 2004, the Corps disbanded 2 brigades (among them, the 52nd Mechanised Brigade in October 2004) and 3 regiments. One brigade and one regiment were added. In 2006, the Corps almost doubled in size.

The corps was disbanded in 2013 and its commander reportedly became the temporary commander of the new Operational Command South.

Structure

 HQ 6th Army Corps
  25th Airborne Brigade (Cherkaske)
  28th Guards Mechanised Brigade - (Chornomorske)
  92nd Mechanized Brigade - (Chuhuiv)
   93rd Mechanized Brigade - (Cherkaske)
  17th Guards Tank Brigade - (Kryvyi Rih)
 55th Artillery Brigade - (Zaporizhia)
 107th Rocket Artillery Regiment - (Kremenchuk)
  11th Army Aviation Regiment - (Chornobaivka)
 73rd Engineer Regiment - (Dniprodzerzhynsk)
 534th Combat Engineer Regiment
 1039th Anti-Aircraft Artillery
 121st Signal Battalion 
 150th Signal Battalion
 502nd Counter Intelligence Battalion

Disbanded Units
  52nd Mechanised Brigade

Commanders

References

Corps of Ukraine
Military units and formations established in 1991
1991 establishments in Ukraine